Malankara Malpan Arch Corepiscopa Curien (Kurian) Kaniyamparambil was a priest in the Jacobite Syrian Christian Church and a scholar in Syriac language, who translated the Bible (വിശുദ്ധഗ്രന്ഥം) from ancient Peshitta text to Malayalam. This is the official bible used by Syriac Orthodox Church in India.

Biography
Kaniyamparambil Achan was born on 27 February 1913 to Paulose and Aayamma of a well-known Christian family Kaniyamparambil in Kanjiramattom. He did education in the schools at Kanjiramattom and Mulanthuruthy. Later he started learning the basics of Jacobite liturgy, Syriac and theology from Very Rev. Augen Ramban at Sion Kodanad. At the age of 15 he was able to master the sacred liturgical language Syriac. He modified Syriac prayer songs translated by Sabhakavi C P Chandy for usage in Jacobite Syrian Orthodox Church. He completed his college education from C.M.S College, Kottayam.

He was ordained as a priest by Malankara Metropolitan Paulose Mar Athanasius. During the apostolic visit of Patriarch of Antioch Saint Ignatius Elias III to Malankara, he served as his secretary. Apostolic Delegate of the Patriarch Mor Julius Elias raised him to the rank of Corepiscopa at the age of 37, the highest order the Church bestows on a married Kassisso.  He also received many titles and medals from Moran Mor Aphrem I, Moran Mor Yakoob III, and Moran Mor Zakka I Iywas, Holy Patriarchs of Antioch and all the East.

Funeral and memorials/ Death and entombment 
Kaniyamparambil Achan passed away at age 102 on 19 October 2015. The remains of Rev. (Dr.) Kurien Arch Corepiscopa, Kaniyamparambil are interred in a tomb in St.Ignatius Jacobite Syrian Church in Kanjiramattom, Ernakulam District, Kerala.

Books
 Holy Bible (വിശുദ്ധഗ്രന്ഥം)(translation into Malayalam)
 Interpretation of the new testament (Malayalam)
 Sh'himo Namaskaram in Malayalam,1976
 Syriac Reader and Meditative Lectures
 Suriyani Sabha Charithravum Viswasa Sathyangalum (Malayalam)(History of Jacobite Syrian Church(English))
 The miracle's of our lord
 Vidhudha Vishwasa Pramanam
 Biography of Chathuruthil Mor Geevarghese Mar Gregorios of Parumala
 Biography of Ignatius Elias III Patriarch of Antioch
 Biography of Baselios Yeldo Maphrian of the East
 Biography of Baselios Sakralla III of Aleppo, Maphrian of the East
 Anchu Parishudhanmar
 Biography of Malankara Metropolitan Paulose Mar Athanasius
 1001 speeches
 Rekshikkapeduvan Nee Enthu Cheyyanam (Malayalam)
 Prayers of Mother Mary
 10 letters of Mother to the Daughter
 Syrian Church History in India (English & Malayalam)
 Joseph (Syriac drama)
 Margonino (Syriac novel)
 Subhashithanagal (Speech)
 The Miracles of Our Lord
 Syriac-English Dictionary
 151 Speeches along with the history of the Holy Church

Awards and recognition

References

Indian Oriental Orthodox Christians
Syriac Orthodox clergy
Translators to Malayalam
Translators of the Bible into Malayalam
Christian clergy from Kochi
1913 births
2015 deaths
Indian centenarians
20th-century translators